Jhaltola is a small village situated between Chaukori and Patal Bhuvanshwar in the highlands of Uttarakhand state in northern India. It is one of several small villages in the area, with the advantage of being located near Highway 309A.

Jhaltola is known for its views of the Himalayan mountain peaks of the western Kumaun range. Some of the peaks visible from Jhaltola are Trisul, Nanda Devi and Panchchuli.

Transport

Villages in Pithoragarh district